William Tyrone "Duce" Branch a.k.a. The Ambassador or Ambassador is a Christian hip-hop artist who has recorded both independently and as a founding member of the group The Cross Movement. Branch is the former president of Cross Movement Ministries. He is an alumnus of Dallas Theological Seminary and has a Master in Theology degree graduating with honors.

Personal life
A graduate of Dallas Theological Seminary, William "Duce" Branch a.k.a. the Ambassador is the co-planter of Epiphany Fellowship in Philadelphia. He has toured globally as a solo artist and with the Cross Movement. He has also served as the president of the non-profit organization Cross Movement Ministries and ministered the gospel through rap and preaching for nearly 15 years.

Building on the success of his second solo project, The Thesis and his Grammy- and Stellar-nominated release HIStory with group the Cross Movement, he released ''The Chop Chop: From Milk to Meat', produced by J.R., Official, Tony Stone and HOTHANDZ. Its first singe was "Gimme Dat!"

As of February 2020, he is the assistant professor of preaching and Bible and undergraduate chapel coordinator for The College at Southeastern Baptist Theological Seminary.

Discography

Studio albums

Guest appearances
 "Why Me" by Trip Lee
 "Everyday All Day Cypha" by Everyday Process featuring Lecrae, FLAME, Phanatik & R-Swift
 "Star Struck" by Da' T.R.U.T.H.
 "It's the S.O.I. (Sons of Intellect Anthem)" by KJ-52 featuring Phanatik credited on the packaging and liner notes as "Deuce"
 "I'm Alive Remix" by Jahaziel featuring G Kid & Da' T.R.U.T.H.
 "One, Two" cuts by DJ Skillspinz
 "Hold Your Ground" cuts by DJ Skillspinz

with the Cross Movement
 "Heaven's Mentality" (1997)
 "House of Representatives" (1998)
 "Human Emergency" (2000)
 "Holy Culture" (2003)
 "Gift Rap" (2004)
 "Higher Definition" (2004)
 "HIStory: Our Place In His Story" (2007)

Music videos
 "The Ambassador - Honor and Glory (Official Music Video)" (1999)
 "Get You Open" (2005)
 "Gimme Dat!" (2008)

References

External links
 

 

African-American Christians
American performers of Christian hip hop music
Cross Movement Records
Rappers from Philadelphia
21st-century American rappers
Living people
Year of birth missing (living people)
21st-century African-American musicians